Beinn a' Chochuill (980 m) is a mountain in the Grampian Mountains of Scotland, located east of Loch Etive in Argyll and Bute.

Somewhat hidden away by the Ben Cruachan range, it is usually climbed in conjunction with its neighbour Beinn Eunaich. It has a long summit ridge and offers fantastic views of the Cruachan range from its summit. The nearest village is Taynuilt.

References

Mountains and hills of Argyll and Bute
Marilyns of Scotland
Munros